Malobikar Katha is an upcoming 2014 Bengali film directed by Monojit Kar and Jhuma Paul.

Plot 
The story of the film revolves around a housewife of a rich family in Kolkata.

Cast 
 Rimjhim Mitra as Malobika
 Nigel Akkara as Aditya (husband of Malobika)
 Shanee Banerjee as Sunny
 Kamalika Banerjee as Kamalika
 Pratyusha Paul as Noa

Production

Casting 
Actress Rimjhim Mitra signed to play the title character Malobika while actor Nigel Akkara will be seen as her husband. Debutant actor Shanee Banerjee selected by directors and producers from an audition to play the parallel male lead. Kamalika Banerjee and newcomer Pratyusha will also play supporting roles in the film.

Filming 
Muhurat of Malobikar Katha  held on November, 2013. The film is currently delayed.

References 

Bengali-language Indian films